William A. Coulter, born William Alexander Coulter (March 7, 1849 – March 13, 1936), was an American painter of marine subjects.  Coulter was a native of Glenariff, County Antrim, in what is today Northern Ireland. He became an apprentice seaman at the age of 13, and after seven years at sea, came to settle in San Francisco in 1869.

Career

In the late 1870s, he went to Europe to study with marine artists Vilhelm Melbye, François Musin, and J. C. Jacobsen. In 1896, he joined the art staff of the San Francisco Call.

Between 1909 and 1920, he painted five 16-by-18-foot murals for the Assembly Room of the Merchants Exchange Building.

During the course of his life, his paintings chronicled the history of shipping and navigation in the San Francisco and San Pablo bays.

Death

Coulter resided in the San Francisco Bay Area until his death on March 13, 1936, at the age of 87, in his Sausalito home. Funeral services were held at the Robert F. Russell Mortuary in Mill Valley.

Legacy

William A. Coulter's most famous work was his San Francisco Fire, 1906.  The SS William A. Coulter was a Liberty ship which was constructed and deployed in 1943, and named in his honor.

In 1923, the United States Post Office issued a commemorative 20-cent stamp with one of Coulter's paintings.  The Hawaii State Art Museum, the Honolulu Museum of Art, the Oakland Museum of California, the Orange County Museum of Art (Newport Beach, CA), and the U.S. Navy Museum (Washington, DC) are among the public collections holding work by William A. Coulter.

References
 Hughes, Edan, Artists in California 1786-1940, Sacramento, Crocker Art Museum, 2002.
 Severson, Don R. Finding Paradise: Island Art in Private Collections, University of Hawaii Press, 2002, pp. 81–2.

External links
 William A. Coulter Exhibition (website of the Paul and Linda Kahn Foundation)
 William Coulter at Visual Arts Cork, Irish artist Encyclopedia
 COULTER, WILLIAM ALEXANDER (1849-1936)

Footnotes

1849 births
1936 deaths
19th-century American painters
20th-century American painters
American male painters
American marine artists
American muralists
Artists from the San Francisco Bay Area
People from Sausalito, California
19th-century American male artists
20th-century American male artists